Madison Metro Transit operates a bus service throughout the City of Madison, Wisconsin, United States and most of its immediate suburbs, including the City of Middleton, Fitchburg, Maple Bluff, Shorewood Hills, Sun Prairie, Verona, and a small portion of McFarland. System-wide, fixed route ridership was 13,385,628 in 2018. Metro Transit also provides supplemental transit services to some Madison middle and high schools. Several schools have switched to yellow buses in 2019. These routes are open to the general public, but have been designed to provide additional services during peak school times. Metro also serves the University of Wisconsin–Madison campus, Eagle Heights University apartments, and some off-campus residential areas, via routes 80, 81, 82, and 84. The "80 routes" are free of charge.

Metro also connects with suburban mass transit services, such as the Monona Lift/Monona Express and Sun Prairie Shared Taxi Shuttle.

Route network 
The route network focuses on hubs at the Capitol Square in downtown Madison and four major transfer points in outer parts of Madison. Core all day routes "pulse" at the transfer points every 30 to 60 minutes and are supplemented by an overlay of commuter service. Many routes serve downtown Madison and the University of Wisconsin Madison where transit use is high.

Several service updates reflected in this article went into effect in August 2013. Significant changes include the restructuring of Routes 9 and 10, significant changes to Route 18, the introduction of two new routes in east Madison - Routes 31 and 35, and the expansion of Route 33 in east Madison.  Route 85 was consolidated into Route 80 in August 2012 due to a UW budget shortfall.

Routes 
	
In the table below, "Via(s)" refer to different patterns the same route may take. For example, "Route 6 via Hayes" means that the bus will travel on the Hayes loop before reaching the West Transfer Point or East Towne Mall - other Route 6 trips may travel "via MATC".

Regular routes

Weekday peak-only routes

UW–Madison Campus Buses
	
All routes in this section are fare free. Operating costs are paid by Associated Students of Madison, UW Transportation Services, and University Housing. When UW–Madison is out of session, route 80 and 84 service is reduced and routes 81 and 82 do not run.
	
80 Memorial Union - Eagle Heights (weekday, weekends, and late night)
	
81 Park, Broom, Johnson/Gorham Loop(s) (evening and late night)
	
82 Observatory, Breese Loop(s) (evening and late night)
	
84 Eagle Heights Express (limited stops) weekdays only

Supplemental Schoolday Service
	
E, E1, E3, E5 - East High School District
L, L1, L3, L5, L7 - La Follette High School District
	
M, M1, M3, M5, M7 - Memorial High School District
W, W1, W3, W5, W7 - West High School District

Discontinued Bus Routes

Summer 2023 redesign 
In summer 2023, the route network will be redesigned to one with fewer routes and more frequent service. The change has had a mixed reception; some have praised the redesign for more frequent service with less transfers, while others have criticized the redesign for eliminating service where the elderly, disabled, and low-income populations used to be able to ride the bus.

Bus Rapid Transit
Madison is also creating a Bus Rapid Transit system slated to open in late 2024. Buses will arrive on BRT lines every 5-15 minutes on weekdays.

Bus fleet 

800-875 New Flyer D40LF (Most have been retired, Main use for school service and extra buses)
876-999, 100-160 Gillig Advantage (several of the oldest in the fleet have been retired)
001-021 Gillig/GM/Allison (Gillig BRT Hybrid)
1901-1915 New Flyer Xcelsior (40' ft) added in 2019.
3 Proterra, Inc. Electric Buses, joined fleet in the summer of 2020, began service late 2022.

Future fleet
 46 New Flyer Xcelsior 60-foot battery electric buses; will be used on a new Bus Rapid Transit line in 2024

Ridership

Gallery

See also
 Badger Bus
 List of intercity bus stops in Wisconsin
 List of bus transit systems in the United States

References

External links
Metro Transit website
Public Transit Data and Trends from the Madison Area Metropolitan Planning Organization

Transportation in Madison, Wisconsin
Bus transportation in Wisconsin